Brithys crini, the amaryllis borer, crinum borer, lily borer or Kew arches, is a moth of the family Noctuidae. It is a garden pest in parts of its range, as their larvae damage the stems and leaves of lilies, especially lilies of the family Amaryllidaceae.

Range
It is found in the coastal areas of the Mediterranean, south to South Africa. Furthermore, it is found in Japan and in Queensland and Northern Territory in Australia towards India and Sri Lanka.

Description

The wingspan of the moth is about 40 mm. Its head, thorax and forewings are very dark brown, but paler toward the wingtips. Sub-basal, median and postmedial indistinct waved lines are black. A curved submarginal ochreous line with ferrous colored lunuled found on each side of it. There is a marginal black lunule series. The hindwings are practically white. Tarsi bear black and white stripes. In Europe the adults are on the wing in July.

Life stages
There are several generations per year, though development slows down in cooler seasons, when the larvae sometimes overwinter by boring into the bulbs of the host plants.

The moth lays clusters of a few dozen eggs on the host plant leaves. The hatching larvae at first remain in groups and mine into the leaves. As they grow they either emerge and feed externally, or proceed down the leaves to their bases or even into the bulbs.

The larvae are aposematically coloured in pale yellows on blacks and browns. They are unpalatable to most vertebrate predators, and also poisonous, feeding as they do, on largely unpalatable and poisonous plants. They are slightly bristly, but the bristles seem to be sensory rather than irritant. Typically they grow to about 40 mm long before pupation.

Food plants
The larvae feed on all species of Crinum, Clivia and Hippeastrum, including Crinum angustifolium, Haemanthus species, Hippeastrum procerum, Pancratium maritimum, Zephyranthes candida, Crocus tommasinianus, Narcissus spp., and Amaryllis belladonna. Commonly they bore into thick leaves or even into the bulbs; Mature larvae are likely to feed externally, especially on thin-leaved plants. Heavy infestations of the caterpillars may kill plants.

Predators
The most effective enemies of the larvae in Europe are the carabid (ground beetle) Scarites buparius and the tenebrionid (darkling beetles), Erodius siculus and Pimelia bipunctata.

Control
Commercial carbaryl dusts are effective in combating the caterpillar, but they cannot reach those that have bored into the plant. The insecticide also reduces populations of predators, so that weekly applications become necessary. For small scale horticulture, or in home gardens it is better to rely on mechanical control, seeking out discoloured feeding patches on leaves and crushing the young larvae before they develop. Heavily infested leaves it often is better to cut out and destroy.

References

External links

 Fauna Europaea

Glottulinae
Owlet moths of Europe
Moths of the Comoros
Owlet moths of Africa
Moths of Japan
Moths of Madagascar
Moths of Mauritius
Moths of Réunion
Moths of the Middle East
Moths described in 1775
Taxa named by Johan Christian Fabricius